Saeh Hill, is a hill in Mukim Lumapas, Brunei-Muara District of Brunei. The Bukit Saeh Recreational Park also exists in nearby Kampong Lumapas 'A'. The hill is known for activities such as hiking and sometimes Jungle Rescue Course for search and rescue.

Description
Notably due to the hill's geographical location, storms heading towards Kampong Ayer were shielded alongside the help of Kota Batu's highlands.

References

Brunei-Muara District
Mountains of Brunei